Unspoken is an American Christian band. The band is composed of Chad Mattson, Jon Lowry, and Ariel Munoz. The band released their debut single, "Who You Are", on the Centricity Music label. Released on June 12, 2012, the song has charted on numerous Christian song charts, and was the only song from the band's debut EP Get to Me to be featured on their first full-length album. The self-titled debut LP Unspoken was released April 1, 2014. A five-song preview EP, The World Is Waking, was released July 24, 2013. They have had four straight top-five AC singles in their career including "Who You Are", "Lift My Life Up", "Start a Fire", and "Good Fight", with "Start a Fire" reaching No. 1; the song "Lift My Life Up" was also included on the 2015 WOW Hits release. The band also toured alongside Big Daddy Weave and Sanctus Real.

Background
Unspoken is a band made up of Chad Mattson on vocals, Jon Lowry on guitars, keys, bass guitar, and vocals, and Ariel Munoz on drums. Former members of the band are Mike Gomez on guitars, Ryan Babin and Don Eanes on keys, Yamil Jimenez on percussion and George Williams on bass guitar. In 2018, Gomez announced his departure from the band. After his departure, the band was joined by guitarist Wiso Aponte and keyboardist Alan Pelno until February 16, 2020, when both announced their departures as well.

Discography

Studio albums

Compilation albums
 Unplugged (May 19, 2015, Centricity)

EPs

Independent
 Unspoken - October 1, 2006

Studio

Singles

Notes

References

External links
 

Musical groups established in 2003
American Christian rock groups
Centricity Music artists